Mike Golding (born 27 August 1960) is an English yachtsman, born in Great Yarmouth and educated at Reading Blue Coat School.  He is one of the few yachtsmen to have raced round the world non stop in both directions. He held the solo record for sailing round the world westabout (the most challenging direction for circumnavigation) between 1994 and 2000.

Golding, who was named president of the Little Ship Club in 2017 and is a member of Royal Southampton Yacht Club, is the eponymous co founder of the commercial company Mike Golding Yacht Racing Ltd. His partner in this venture was Jorgen Philip-Sorensen (d.2010).

Golding led the team Group 4 to second place in the British Steel Challenge in 1992–3. He did one better in the next edition the BT Global Challenge 1996–7, taking first place with a new team of amateur sailors, again onboard Group 4.

Golding came seventh in the 2000–2001 Vendée Globe solo non stop round the world race having lost seven days to the dismasting of his Open 60, again called Group 4. His present Open 60 campaign is sponsored by Ecover, a Belgian ecological cleaning products company which has sponsored his team since 2001. In 2004, he won the IMOCA World Championship and successfully defended his title the following year, in which he also won the 2005 FICO World Championship. In the 2004 Vendée Globe, Golding finished third despite losing his keel — an accident which had caused boats in previous Vendée Globe races to overturn — on the last day of the race. He sailed the last fifty miles with a tiny sailplan to keep the boat upright.

In October 2006, he started the Velux 5 Oceans yacht race. He rescued fellow sailor Alex Thomson in the Southern Ocean, then the yacht Ecover had a mast failure with them both aboard. He announced he was retiring from the race on making emergency landfall in Cape Town.

In March 2007 Golding announced a technical partnership with fellow British sailor Dee Caffari to allow both the UK entries in the Vendée Globe 2008–9 round the world yacht race to work together.

Golding skippered the Ecover Sailing Team in the 2009 iShares cup, a selection  of races all over Europe, sailing catamarans in fast, competitive races against world-leaders in this sport. The races took place in Venice, Hyères, Cowes, Kiel, Amsterdam and Almeria.

With four races to go in the iShares cup event in Cowes Week (Isle of Wight), Golding's team's dagger board broke but the team still completed the last four races and finished second in the last race.

Golding lives with his wife and son in Warsash, Hampshire, near Southampton.

Career highlights

References
 
'Mike Golding', The Observer, 13 February 2006 (London).

External links
 Mike Golding Official Website

Single-handed circumnavigating sailors
1960 births
Living people
English male sailors (sport)
World champions in sailing for Great Britain
2000 Vendee Globe sailors
2004 Vendee Globe sailors
2008 Vendee Globe sailors
2012 Vendee Globe sailors
British Vendee Globe sailors
Vendée Globe finishers
People educated at Reading Blue Coat School
Sportspeople from Great Yarmouth
Extreme Sailing Series sailors